Henriette Spitzeder née Schüler, also Henriette Spitzeder-Schüler (18 March 1800 – 30 November 1828), was a German operatic soprano and actress. She began her career in Nuremberg. Together with her husband, the bass Josef Spitzeder, she moved on to the Theater am Kärntnertor in Vienna and the Königsstädtisches Theater in Berlin. The couple often appeared together on stage, including Mozart's Figaro and Susanna.

Life 
Born Henriette Schüler in Dessau, she was the daughter of the comedian Carl Schüler (1775–1809) and Eugenie Schüler née Bonasegla. Her parents moved to several theatres. In Kassel, she was educated at a boarding school (Erziehungsanstalt). After her father died in 1809, her mother moved to the Karlsruhe Court Theatre in 1812, where she was also Henriette's voice teacher.

Henriette Schüler, made her debut at the age of 14 at the Nuremberg Opera, under the pseudonym Dlle. Schäfer as Queen of the Night in Mozart's Die Zauberflöte. Her intonation, pure voice and precision was noted. A 1815 review in the Morgenblatt für gebildete Stände mentioned her full, pleasant voice ("volle, angenehme Stimme") and musicality ("gut musikalisch"). She also performed roles in plays. In 1816, she married Josef Spitzeder, a bass singer. The couple appeared together as Figaro and Susanna in Mozart's Le nozze di Figaro, and as Sextus and Publius in La clemenza di Tito, among others. In 1819, she and her husband joined the company of the Theater am Kärntnertor court opera in Vienna, beginning as High Priest and Donna Elvira in Peter Winter's Das unterbrochene Opferfest on 22 April 1819. She became particularly popular as Zerlina in Mozart's Don Giovanni and as Cherubino in Le nozze di Figaro. She also appeared as a guest, such as to the Königsstädtisches Theater in Berlin. She was engaged there, together with her husband, and was successful especially in coloratura roles. She retired from the stage in 1828, and died in Berlin giving birth to her tenth child, not even 28 years old.

References

External links 
 Spitzeder, Henriette on BMLO

German operatic sopranos
1800 births
1828 deaths
People from Dessau-Roßlau
Deaths in childbirth
19th-century German women opera singers